In mathematics, the Khinchin integral (sometimes spelled Khintchine integral), also known as the Denjoy–Khinchin integral, generalized Denjoy integral or wide Denjoy integral, is one of a number of definitions of the integral of a function.  It is a generalization of the Riemann and Lebesgue integrals. It is named after Aleksandr Khinchin and Arnaud Denjoy, but is not to be confused with the (narrow) Denjoy integral.

Motivation

If g : I → R is a Lebesgue-integrable function on some interval I = [a,b], and if

is its Lebesgue indefinite integral, then the following assertions are true:

f is absolutely continuous (see below)
f is differentiable almost everywhere
Its derivative coincides almost everywhere with g(x).  (In fact, all absolutely continuous functions are obtained in this manner.)

The Lebesgue integral could be defined as follows: g is Lebesgue-integrable on I iff there exists a function f that is absolutely continuous whose derivative coincides with g almost everywhere.

However, even if f : I → R is differentiable everywhere, and g is its derivative, it does not follow that f is (up to a constant) the Lebesgue indefinite integral of g, simply because g can fail to be Lebesgue-integrable, i.e., f can fail to be absolutely continuous.  An example of this is given by the derivative g of the (differentiable but not absolutely continuous) function f(x)=x²·sin(1/x²) (the function g is not Lebesgue-integrable around 0).

The Denjoy integral corrects this lack by ensuring that the derivative of any function f that is everywhere differentiable (or even differentiable everywhere except for at most countably many points) is integrable, and its integral reconstructs f up to a constant; the Khinchin integral is even more general in that it can integrate the approximate derivative of an approximately differentiable function (see below for definitions).  To do this, one first finds a condition that is weaker than absolute continuity but is satisfied by any approximately differentiable function. This is the concept of generalized absolute continuity; generalized absolutely continuous functions will be exactly those functions which are indefinite Khinchin integrals.

Definition

Generalized absolutely continuous function

Let I = [a,b] be an interval and f : I → R be a real-valued function on I.

Recall that f is absolutely continuous on a subset E of I if and only if for every positive number ε there is a positive number δ such that whenever a finite collection  of pairwise disjoint subintervals of I with endpoints in E satisfies

it also satisfies

Define the function f to be generalized absolutely continuous on a subset E of I if the restriction of f to E is continuous (on E) and E can be written as a countable union of subsets Ei such that f is absolutely continuous on each Ei.  This is equivalent to the statement that every nonempty perfect subset of E contains a portion on which f is absolutely continuous.

Approximate derivative

Let E be a Lebesgue measurable set of reals. Recall that a real number x (not necessarily in E) is said to be a point of density of E when

 

(where μ denotes Lebesgue measure). (If furthermore g(x)  = y, we can say that g is approximately continuous at x.) Equivalently, g has approximate limit y at x if and only if there exists a measurable subset F of E such that x is a point of density of F and the (usual) limit at x of the restriction of f to F is y. Just like the usual limit, the approximate limit is unique if it exists.

Finally, a Lebesgue-measurable function f : E → R is said to have approximate derivative y at x iff

has approximate limit y at x; this implies that f is approximately continuous at x.

A theorem

Recall that it follows from Lusin's theorem that a Lebesgue-measurable function is approximately continuous almost everywhere (and conversely).  The key theorem in constructing the Khinchin integral is this: a function f that is generalized absolutely continuous (or even of "generalized bounded variation", a weaker notion) has an approximate derivative almost everywhere.  Furthermore, if f is generalized absolutely continuous and its approximate derivative is nonnegative almost everywhere, then f is nondecreasing, and consequently, if this approximate derivative is zero almost everywhere, then f is constant.

The Khinchin integral

A particular case

If f : I → R is continuous and has an approximate derivative everywhere on I except for at most countably many points, then f is, in fact, generalized absolutely continuous, so it is the (indefinite) Khinchin-integral of its approximate derivative.

This result does not hold if the set of points where f is not assumed to have an approximate derivative is merely of Lebesgue measure zero, as the Cantor function shows.

Notes

References
 Springer Encyclopedia of Mathematics: article "Denjoy integral"
 Springer Encyclopedia of Mathematics: article "Approximate derivative"
 
 
 

Definitions of mathematical integration